Pennine Radio Limited is a UK manufacturer of electronic equipment, transformers and inductors, ride on electric golf carts, sheet metalwork and computer equipment.
Founded in 1958 the company started off producing radio receivers and adapters to enable the new band III ITV television broadcasts. However they soon expanded into industrial electronics. In the early days they produced many innovative designs for the woollen industry which surrounded Huddersfield.

Pennine Radio's Headquarters are in a Victorian grade 2 listed building on Fitzwilliam Street Huddersfield.

The company currently manufactures golf carts, transformers, and offers contract printed circuit board, electronics assembly, and sheet-metal fabrication. The company is wholly owned by one family.

Notes

External links 
 Pennine Radio Website

Electronics companies of the United Kingdom
Companies based in Kirklees
Electronics companies established in 1958
1958 establishments in the United Kingdom